Xanthomelanopsis   is a genus of tachinid flies in the family Tachinidae.

Species
X. articulata (Wulp, 1892)
X. brasiliensis Townsend, 1917
X. peruana (Townsend, 1911)
X. trigonalis (Wulp, 1892)

External links

Phasiinae
Diptera of South America
Tachinidae genera
Taxa named by Charles Henry Tyler Townsend